Tony Llorens (born August 2, 1952) is an American musician, composer, pianist, and actor, known for the films A Wedding (1978), No God, No Master (2013) and Heavens Fall (2006). He has worked  as music director for Chicago based ETA Creative Arts Foundation theater. He also worked as keyboardist, bandleader, and producer for Albert King and worked with ZZ Top and Stevie Ray Vaughan. Jason Moran is his second cousin.

Filmography 
As musician and composer:

As actor:

Discography

See also 
 "Give Me the Simple Life" from A Wedding (1978)

References

External links
 
 

Living people
1952 births
20th-century American composers
American blues musicians
20th-century American pianists
American male pianists
American male composers
21st-century American pianists
20th-century American male musicians
21st-century American male musicians